Anirudh Ravichander  (born 16 October 1990), also credited mononymously as Anirudh, is an Indian music composer, music producer, singer who works in the Indian film industry, primarily in Tamil films. He is the son of actor Ravi Raghavendra and the nephew of Rajinikanth. He has won three Filmfare Awards, nine SIIMA Awards, six Edison Awards and five Vijay Awards. 

His debut song "Why This Kolaveri Di", composed for the 2012 film 3, went viral across the globe and has achieved over 300 million views on YouTube. A.R. Murugadoss signed him to compose music for Kaththi (2014) starring Vijay, which included the viral hit "Selfie Pulla". The soundtrack for the film became Anirudh's highest profile soundtrack until he was signed to compose music for Rajinikanth's Petta in 2019.

In 2016, he signed a record deal with Sony Music, which publishes his independent albums and live concerts. In the same year, he featured with Diplo on the remix of Major Lazer's hit single "Cold Water".

Early life and family 
Anirudh Ravichander is the son of actor Ravi Raghavendra and classical dancer Lakshmi Ravichander and nephew of Latha Rajinikanth. Thus, making Aishwarya, Soundarya and Hrishikesh his cousins. Anirudh's great-grandfather was director Krishnaswami Subrahmanyam, a filmmaker in the 1930s.

He graduated from the Loyola College, Chennai in 2011, which according to him was just a backup in case his music career did not take off. Anirudh learnt piano from Trinity College of Music, London. He also was part of a fusion band. In his school days, Anirudh and his band participated in a reality TV show judged by A. R. Rahman, and his band was one of the winners along with five other bands. .

Career

2011–2012: Debut and early success 

Anirudh Ravichander made his debut as a music composer in his cousin Aishwarya R. Dhanush's directorial debut 3, starring Dhanush. While pursuing his degree at Loyola College, he had done background scores for the short films made by Aishwaryaa and his work on short films convinced her to have him work on her first commercial venture. In early November 2011, a leaked version of a song from the film Why This Kolaveri Di!, circulated online and the film's team decided to subsequently release it officially. It instantly became popular on social networking sites for its quirky Tanglish lyrics. Soon, the song became the most searched YouTube video in India and internet phenomenon across Asia. The song revolves around the film's main actor being dumped by his girlfriend; the song is sung by the character in a drunken state, with many of the lines nonsensical. According to the composer, 3s director Aishwarya R. Dhanush wanted a light-hearted song about failed love. Ravichander quickly composed the tune in about 10 minutes.

The remaining songs of the album were released in December and also received very positive reviews from critics. A reviewer from Behindwoods noted, "Such a promising debut by a composer hasn't been seen in recent Tamil cinema history", while Rediff.com's reviewer noted that "all the songs in 3 are good and come with appealing instrumental arrangements", concluding that it was "an intriguing collection." Anirudh also received praise for his background score in the film. He consequently went on to gain recognition for the film through accolades, notably the Vijay Award for Best Find of the Year as well as nominations at the South Indian International Movie Awards and the 60th Filmfare Awards South. He also worked on the Telugu dubbed version of the film. Anirudh teamed up with Dhanush soon after to produce a Kolaveri-inspired track titled "Sachin anthem" commemorating Sachin Tendulkar in association with the health drink, Boost.

2013–2015: Continued success 

Next, he sang and composed a single for David – a multi-starrer directed by Bejoy Nambiar; "Kanave Kanave" in Tamil and "Yu Hi Re" in Hindi. The album also opened to very positive reviews, with a critic noting: Anirudh's song was "the pick of the album". His next album was Ethir Neechal, starring Sivakarthikeyan. Anirudh introduced rappers Yo Yo Honey Singh and Hiphop Tamizha in the album. Moreover, Sony Music India released the complete background score of Ethir Neechal via YouTube owing to its popularity. His next soundtrack, Vanakkam Chennai released in July 2013. For the song "Oh Penne", he roped in Vishal Dadlani for the first time in Tamil music. Another promotional song, "Chennai City Gangster", saw him collaborate again with Hiphop Tamizha and British Indian rapper Hard Kaur, with the trio also featuring in a music video for the film.  In September 2013, he was signed on to compose the background score for Selvaraghavan's fantasy film Irandam Ulagam, after Harris Jayaraj had opted out. Anirudh noted his happiness at working with Selvaraghavan early in his career, despite being called up as a replacement and subsequently recorded for the film in Budapest.

Anirudh's next release Velaiyilla Pattathari, featured a song by veteran singer S. Janaki. while adding "in all, the album is soulful, lively and truly Anirudh". The film subsequently became a blockbuster at the box office, with Anirudh receiving the Filmfare award for best music director. His next film was Maan Karate, starring Sivakarthikeyan.

A.R. Murugadoss then signed him on to compose music for Kaththi, starring Vijay, becoming Anirudh's highest profile album at the time. The album and especially the background score received positive reviews from critics and topped the iTunes India Charts.

Next, Anirudh again collaborated with Sivakarthikeyan for the film Kaaki Sattai, produced by Dhanush under his production company. Then, Anirudh scored music for Maari, with Dhanush. The music received positive reviews, with the song "Don'u Don'u Don'u" becoming exceptionally popular. He also received critical acclaim for his work in the Vijay Sethupathi starrer Naanum Rowdy Dhaan, leading him to receive many accolades for his achievement in the film. He released a single from the movie Aakko on Valentine's Day in 2015 of the name "Ennakenna Yaarum Illaiye". He also scored his first Ajith Kumar film in Vedalam, directed by Siva. Anirudh's music received mixed reviews, however, the song "Aaluma Doluma", became a hit. Anirudh concluded the year with Thangamagan, starring Dhanush.

2016–2017 
In February 2016, for Valentine's Day, he released a single titled "Avalukena", under Sony Music. After a short break, Anirudh released a single from Rum in April 2016; "Hola Amigo". In May 2016, Anirudh signed a deal with Sony Music India for his independent albums and live concerts.

Anirudh again teamed up with Sivakarthikeyan For Remo. In late 2017, for the film Vivegam, Anirudh launched the first single "Surviva" and became fastest Tamil song to get 1 million streams, this track saw Yogi B performing in a Tamil film after a long hiatus.

He again teamed up with Sivakarthikeyan for the fifth time with Velaikkaaran. A Hindi pop music video Bewajah, composed  and sung by Anirudh, Irene and Srinidhi Venkatesh was released by Sony Music India. The song became an instant hit etching several million views.

2018–present
In 2018, he made his Telugu debut with Agnyaathavaasi which was received well. Next, he composed for Suriya's Thaanaa Serndha Koottam, a remake of Special 26. After that, he composed for Nayanthara's Kolamavu Kokila, which was well received and was praised for being unique.

His next big project came with Petta, directed by Karthik Subbaraj and starring his uncle Rajinikanth. On 10 December, the full album for Rajinikanth's Petta was released by Anirudh. His next project was Nani's Telugu film Jersey, which is directed by Gowtam Tinnanuri. He later composed for Gang Leader which was directed by Vikram K Kumar. This marked his second collaboration with Nani. After that was Darbar, directed by AR Murugadoss. He then composed one of the songs of the soundtrack for Dharala Prabhu, the title track, which garnered success.

In 2020, he collaborated with Vijay for the 2nd time in Master, directed by Lokesh Kanagaraj. The first single, "Kutti Story", sung by Vijay himself, received great praise and became popular around the world for its Tanglish lyrics. The second single sung by Gana Balachander, "Vaathi Coming", became an instant viral hit universally.

He also came to work on the soundtrack of Doctor, directed by Nelson Dilipkumar. The first single "Chellamma" was a hit among the youth with the fun and romantic lyrics, collecting over 100 million views on YouTube. In 2021, he worked with Vijay for the 3rd time in Beast directed by Nelson, whom he also worked with for the 3rd consecutive time. The first single "Arabic Kuthu", was a fusion featuring Arabic phrases and rhyming verses in Tamil. The song set the record for the most-viewed and liked South Indian song within 24 hours, and is currently his most-viewed single with over 500 million views.

His work in Vikram marked his first release with Kamal Haasan, although the duo collaborated first on Indian 2 yet to be released. The first single of Vikram titled "Pathala Pathala" received several million views from fans and was the most viewed song on YouTube. He also composed for Sivakarthikeyan's Don and Vijay Sethupathi's Kaathuvaakula Rendu Kaadhal.

After a hiatus, he returned to compose for Dhanush with Thiruchitrambalam. The first single of Thiruchitrambalam titled "Thaai Kelavi" was released on 24 June 2022 and its lyrics proved controversial. A social activist lodged a complaint against the makers of the film asking them to change the lyrics of the song, citing disrespect to elderly people.

After A. R. Rahman turned down an offer by Atlee to compose for his Bollywood film Jawan with Shah Rukh Khan, Anirudh was chosen to compose for the film. An announcement teaser featuring Anirudh's score was released in June 2022. Jawan marks the first full-fledged debut for Anirudh in Bollywood as a composer as his previous Hindi films David and Jersey featured just a single and reused film from the original, respectively. He is also set to compose music for Rajinikanth’s 169th film titled Jailer directed by Nelson. The film will also mark Anirudh’s third collaboration with Rajini after Petta and Darbar and fourth with Nelson after Kolamaavu Kokila, Doctor and Beast. He is also set to collaborate with Ajith for his 62nd film tentatively titled AK62 directed by Vignesh Shivan which marks his third collaboration with Ajith after Vedalam and Vivegam. He is also set to compose music for N.T. Ramarao Jr.'s untitled Telugu film tentatively titled NTR30 which is directed by Koratala Siva.

Discography

As a film composer 
 The films are listed in order of music release, regardless of the dates of film release.
 The year next to the super of the indicated films indicates the release year of the either dubbed or remade version in the named language later than the original version.
  Indicates original language release. Indicates simultaneous makes, if featuring in more languages
 indicates a guest composer of the film released

Upcoming films

Independent works and music videos

As a playback singer

Filmography

Appearances in songs

Awards

Other honors

References

External links 

 
 
 
 

Loyola College, Chennai alumni
Living people
Musicians from Chennai
1990 births
Tamil film score composers
Tamil playback singers
Indian folk-pop singers
21st-century Indian composers
21st-century Indian singers
Singers from Tamil Nadu
Indian male film score composers
21st-century Indian male singers